Tambora may refer to:

Music
Tambora (drum), different types of percussion instruments
Tambour (guitar technique) can also be spelled tambora

Geography
Mount Tambora, a volcano on the Indonesian island of Sumbawa
The 1815 eruption of Mount Tambora
Tambora culture, a village and associated culture on Sumbawa, destroyed by the 1815 eruption
Tambora language, the associated language
Tambora, Jakarta, a subdistrict of West Jakarta
Tumbura, a town in South Sudan

See also
 Tambour (disambiguation)
 Tanpura, also called as Tambora, an instrument used in Indian classical music for continuous production of consonating reference notes (tonic)

Language and nationality disambiguation pages